The 2018–19 Dutch Basketball League (DBL) was the 59th season of the Dutch Basketball League, the highest professional basketball league in the Netherlands. The regular season started on 6 October 2018 and ended 30 April 2019. The best eight teams qualify for the playoffs which start on 2 May 2019. Donar was the defending champion.

The season saw Landstede Zwolle win its first domestic championship, after defeating defending champions Donar in the finals.

Format
Due to the increase of teams from nine to ten, the format for the DBL season was changed. The eight highest-placed teams during the regular season qualify for the play-offs, while the two last-placed teams are eliminated. In the quarter-finals, a best-of-three series is played. In the semi-finals, a best-of-five series is played. The finals are decided through a best-of-seven series.

Teams

On 3 May 2018, the DBL officially announced the Dutch Windmills would make their debut in the upcoming season. Forward Lease Rotterdam changed its name to Feyenoord Basketball, as the team became a part of the multi-sports club of association football club Feyenoord. 

Despite reaching the semi-finals of the NBB Cup and being in the fifth place in the DBL, Windmills struggled with financial problems throughout the season. In December 2018, Windmills was refused entrance to its home arena due to its payment arrears. On 10 April 2019, it was announced that Windmills would withdraw from the DBL. Its results in the second half of the competition were scrapped by the DBL.

Arenas and locations
{| class="wikitable sortable"  
|-
! Club
! Location
! Venue
! Capacity
|-
| Apollo Amsterdam || Amsterdam || Apollohal  || align=center | 1,500
|-
| Aris Leeuwarden || Leeuwarden ||  Kalverdijkje || align=center | 1,700
|-
| BAL || Weert || Sporthal Boshoven || align=center | 1,000
|-
|  Den Helder Suns || Den Helder || Sporthal Sportlaan || align=center |1,000
|-
|  Donar || Groningen || MartiniPlaza  || align=center | 4,350
|-
|  Dutch Windmills || Dordrecht || Sporthal de Boulevard || align=center |1,100
|-
|  Feyenoord || Rotterdam || Topsportcentrum || align=center | 1,000
|-
|  Landstede || Zwolle || Landstede Sportcentrum || align=center | 1,200
|-
|  New Heroes || 's-Hertogenbosch || Maaspoort  || align=center | 2,800
|-
|   ZZ Leiden || Leiden || Vijf Meihal || align=center | 2,000
|}

Personnel and sponsorship

Coaching changes

Players

Foreign players
In 2017, league policy was changed and the number of allowed foreign players per team was increased from 4 to 5. Additional was the restriction that a team is not allowed to have five foreign players on the court at the same time.

Notable transactions
Transactions including players who have won a DBL award, were named to an All-DBL Team or were DBL All-Stars.

Notable retirements

Regular season

League table

Results

Note: Dutch Windmills withdrew from the tournament during the third round. Only matches of the two first rounds would count for the league table.

Playoffs

Bracket

Quarter-finals

|}

Semi-finals

|}

Finals

|}

Final standings
The final standings are based upon performance in the playoffs.

Awards

Dutch clubs in European competitions

See also
2018–19 NBB Cup
2018 Dutch Basketball Supercup

References

Dutch Basketball League seasons
1
Netherlands